Hot Rod is a 1950 American drama film directed by Lewis D. Collins and starring Jimmy Lydon, Art Baker and Gil Stratton.

Cast
Jimmy Lydon as David Langham 
Art Baker as Judge Langham
Gil Stratton as Clarence "Swifty" Johnson
Gloria Winters as Janie Evans 
Myron Healey as Joe Langham 
Tommy Bond as Jack Blodgett 
Jean Dean as Gloria 
Bret Hamilton as Paul
Marshall Reed as John C. Roberts 
Dennis Moore as motorcycle patrolman 
Sailor Vincent as holdup man

References

External links

1950 drama films
American auto racing films
American drama films
Films directed by Lewis D. Collins
Monogram Pictures films
American black-and-white films
1950s English-language films
1950s American films